is a Japanese actress, entertainer, gravure idol, and singer represented by Sun Music Production. She graduated from Jumonji Junior College.

Filmography

Dramas

Variety series

Radio series

Films

References

External links
 

1981 births
Living people
People from Nagareyama
Actors from Chiba Prefecture
Japanese television personalities
Japanese gravure idols
Japanese women pop singers
21st-century Japanese singers
21st-century Japanese women singers
Japanese actresses